Cleared for Take Off is a compilation album of music from the San Francisco rock band Jefferson Airplane.

Much of the album features songs from the band's first two albums, Jefferson Airplane Takes Off and Surrealistic Pillow. Other tracks like "Don't Let Me Down" did not even appear on a Jefferson Airplane album. All of the tracks are live performances by the band.

Track listing
"3/5 of a Mile in Ten Seconds" – 4:37
"Don't Let Me Down" – 2:53
"Don't Slip Away" – 2:32
"She Has Funny Cars" – 3:36
"Let's Get Together" – 5:31
"High Flyin' Bird" – 2:35
"It's No Secret" – 2:38
"Jorma's Blues" – 2:38
"Plastic Fantastic Lover" – 3:48
"Runnin' 'Round This World" – 3:11
"Somebody to Love" – 2:54
"The Other Side of This Life" – 5:12
"Thing" – 11:25
"Tobacco Road" – 3:27
"Today" – 3:01
"White Rabbit" – 2:29
"You're Bringing Me Down" – 2:41
"You're My Best Friend" – 3:20

References

Jefferson Airplane compilation albums
2003 compilation albums